The National Central Library (NCL) is the national library of the Republic of China (Taiwan), which is located at No. 20, Zhongshan S. Rd., Zhongzheng District, Taipei City 10001, Taiwan. It will soon have a subsidiary called Southern Branch of the National Central Library & National Repository Library.

Mission 
The National Central Library is the sole national library of Taiwan. Its mission is to acquire, catalog, and preserve national publications for government, research and general public use. The Rare Books Collection is one of the leading collections of Chinese antique books and manuscripts in the world. The library also assists research, sponsors educational activities, promotes librarianship, carries out international exchange activities, and strengthens cooperation between domestic and foreign libraries. The library also supports Sinological research through the affiliated Center for Chinese Studies (CCS). As a research library, the NCL encourages staff members to conduct research in specialized fields. The NCL also cooperates with publishers and other libraries to develop its role as a leading center for knowledge and information resources and services in Taiwan.

Organization 
Following a revision to its organic law on 31 January 1996, the NCL was administratively reorganized into the following departments: Director-general's Office, Acquisitions Division, Cataloging Division, Reader Services Division, Reference Services Division, Special Collection Division, Information Division, Guidance Division, Research Division, ISBN Center, Bibliographic Information Center, Sinology Research Center, International Publication Exchange Department, General Affair Division, Accounting Office, Personnel Office, Civil Service Ethics Office.

History time line 
 1933: Founded in Nanjing,  First Director Chiang Fu-Tsung (蔣復璁)
 1938: Relocated to Chongqing
 1940-41: "Rare Book Preservation Society" acquired 130,000 rare books & manuscripts for Library
 1949: Relocated to Taipei, the remained in Nanjing was later renamed Nanjing Library
 1954: Reopened to the public at the Nanhai Academy
 1981: Began sponsorship of the Resource and Information Center for Chinese Studies
 1987: Resource and Information Center for Chinese Studies renamed as the Center for Chinese Studies
 1988: Opened the Information and Computing Library
 1996: The Organic Statute of the National Central Library promulgated
 1998: Established Reference Services Division, Research Division, Guidance Division, Information Division
 2003: 70th anniversary of the Library

Images

See also
List of libraries in Taipei
Nanjing Library

External links

Official website 
Official website 

1933 establishments in China
1949 establishments in Taiwan
Libraries in Taipei
Libraries established in 1933
Taiwan, Republic of China
World Digital Library partners